Frumușița River may refer to:

 Frumușița, a tributary of the Băiaș in Vâlcea County
 Frumușița, a tributary of the Chineja in Galați County

See also 
 Frumușița, a commune in Galați County, Romania
 Frumoasa River (disambiguation)
 Frumosu River (disambiguation)